The Hohgant is a mountain of the Emmental Alps, located south of the Emmental in the canton of Berne. The main summit has an elevation of 2,197 metres above sea level and is distinguished by the name Furggengütsch.

Several caves (F1 and K2 networks) developing in the Urgonian limestone formation (Aptian) have their entrances on the Hohgant mountain. The F1 cave is connected to the Siebenhengste cave network.

See also
 Siebenhengste-Hohgant-Höhle

References

External links
 Hohgant on Hikr

Mountains of the Alps
Mountains of Switzerland
Mountains of the canton of Bern
Two-thousanders of Switzerland